The Boston and Providence Railroad was a railroad company in the states of Massachusetts and Rhode Island which connected its namesake cities. It opened in two sections in 1834 and 1835 - one of the first rail lines in the United States - with a more direct route into Providence built in 1847. Branches were built to Dedham in 1834, Stoughton in 1845, and North Attleboro in 1871. It was acquired by the Old Colony Railroad in 1888, which in turn was leased by the New Haven Railroad in 1893. The line became the New Haven's primary mainline to Boston; it was realigned in Boston in 1899 during the construction of South Station, and in Pawtucket and Central Falls in 1916 for grade crossing elimination.

The line became part of the Penn Central system in 1969; the section in Massachusetts was purchased by the state in 1973, while Amtrak acquired the Rhode Island section in 1976. The line was electrified in 2000; it is now the far northern leg of Amtrak's Northeast Corridor, used by high-speed Acela Express service, intercity Northeast Regional service, and MBTA Commuter Rail Providence/Stoughton Line local service. The rapid transit MBTA Orange Line shares the right-of-way for several miles in the 1987-built Southwest Corridor section in Boston. The Stoughton Branch is also used for Providence/Stoughton Line service, and the northern section of the Dedham Branch is used by the Needham Line.

History
The Boston and Providence Railroad was incorporated June 21, 1831, and chartered to build a railroad between Boston and Providence, Rhode Island.

Construction began in late 1832. The first section, from Boston to Canton with a branch to Dedham, opened in 1834, and the rest on July 28, 1835 with the completion of the Canton Viaduct. Stations in Jamaica Plain allowed the development of one of the first commuter suburbs in America.

In 1887, the railroad's Bussey Bridge collapsed while a morning commuter train was passing over it. The train was carrying about 300 passengers at the time, of which 24 died and 125 were seriously injured. Henry Austin Whitney was the president of the railroad at the time.

Until 1899, when South Station opened, the Boston terminal was at Park Square, with a crossing at grade of the Boston and Worcester Railroad at the current merge at Back Bay station (also opened in 1899, serving only the B&P). The original Providence terminal was at Fox Point, from which it ran east along the Seekonk River shore and over the river via the India Point Railroad Bridge into East Providence (then part of Seekonk, Massachusetts) before turning north towards Boston. A ferry across the Providence River connected Fox Point to the South Providence terminal of the New York, Providence and Boston Railroad (opened 1837). The former mainline became the freight-only East Junction Branch.

In 1847, the Providence and Worcester Railroad opened between downtown Providence and Worcester, Massachusetts. At the same time, the B&P built a connection west from its main line in southern Attleboro to the P&W in Central Falls. The B&P and P&W jointly owned the line south of Central Falls into downtown Providence. (In 1848, the NYP&B connected its line south of downtown Providence to downtown, removing the gap through Providence.)

On April 1, 1888, the Old Colony Railroad leased the B&P for 99 years. The New York, New Haven and Hartford Railroad leased the Old Colony on March 1, 1893, and assumed the lease. The New Haven used the B&P as part of its main Boston - New York City Shore Line.

When Boston's South Station opened in 1899, a new line was built along the south side of the Boston and Albany Railroad to it, near the B&A's terminal. The old line to Park Square was abandoned.

The East Side Railroad Tunnel opened in 1908 between the East Side of Providence, Rhode Island and downtown Providence. This provided a second route into Providence, using the old alignment to East Providence and the Crook Point Bascule Bridge over the Seekonk River leading to the tunnel. The tunnel is no longer in use, having been disconnected on the downtown side, with its entrance underneath the What Cheer Building, owned by RISD.

In 1939, the railroad filed with the Interstate Commerce Commission for reorganization in the New Haven rail system or operation as an independent line.

Current status
The Penn Central Transportation Company was created in 1968 through a merger that included the New York, New Haven and Hartford Railroad. The Penn Central bankruptcy in the early 1970s coincided with the creation of Amtrak. Penn Central merged the Boston and Providence Railroad into itself in 1972.

The New Haven's former B&P Boston-New York City main line was included with the former Pennsylvania Railroad's New York City-Washington, D.C. main line as a new high-speed passenger route for Amtrak, the Northeast Corridor. It hosts the Acela, the only high-speed rail service in North America.

In 1973, the MBTA purchased the portion of the B&P main line in Massachusetts, including the Stoughton Branch, forming what is now the Providence/Stoughton Line. The portion in Rhode Island was sold to Amtrak in 1976.

Branches
Dedham

The first branch was the Dedham Branch to Dedham from Readville, opened in 1834 with the first section of the railroad. The Norfolk County Railroad opened in 1849, continuing from Dedham to the southwest. In 1850, a second branch to Dedham opened from Forest Hills, forming a loop. Another outlet for the Dedham Branch opened in 1906, with a connection west to the New England Railroad at Needham Junction. The Dedham Branch from Forest Hills to that connection is still in use as the Needham Branch of the MBTA Commuter Rail, but the rest of the Dedham loop has been abandoned.

Stoughton
The Stoughton Branch Railroad was incorporated April 16, 1844 as a branch of the B&P from Canton Junction to Stoughton. It opened in early 1845, and is still in use for passengers as a branch of the main line to Attleboro and Providence.

Easton
The Easton Branch Railroad was incorporated in 1854 and opened in 1855 as a continuation of the Stoughton Branch beyond Stoughton. In 1865, the Old Colony and Newport Railway bought the line and incorporated the majority of it into its main line.

Taunton
The Taunton Branch Railroad was incorporated in 1835 to build a branch from the B&P in Mansfield to Taunton, opening in 1836. The branch was operated by the B&P until 1840, when the New Bedford and Taunton Railroad opened, continuing the line past Taunton.

In 1870, the Mansfield and Framingham Railroad opened, continuing the Taunton Branch northwest on the other side of the B&P. A connection between the Taunton Branch northwest of Taunton and the B&P in Attleboro opened in 1871, built by the Taunton Branch.

Attleborough
The Attleborough Branch Railroad opened in 1870, running from the B&P in Attleboro northwest to North Attleborough. It was leased to the B&P, and was connected to a branch of the Old Colony Railroad in 1890.

Moshassuck Valley
The Moshassuck Valley Railroad was chartered in 1874 and opened in 1876 as a branch from the joint B&P/P&W at Woodlawn, Rhode Island north to Saylesville. The company remained independent until 1981, when it was bought by the P&W.

Seekonk
The Seekonk Branch Railroad was a short spur on the east side of the Seekonk River, from the B&P south to a dock on the river. It was incorporated in 1836 and opened soon after, with the hope that it would run its own trains over the B&P, as with a highway. As a result of this, the Massachusetts State Legislature passed a law that a railroad company could refuse any traffic on its road, and the company was a failure. The B&P bought it in 1839, and the Providence, Warren and Bristol Railroad built a line from it in 1855.

Warren, Bristol and Fall River
The Providence and Bristol Railroad was incorporated in 1850 and 1851, and reorganized in 1852 as the Providence, Warren and Bristol Railroad. It opened in 1855 from the old Seekonk Branch in East Providence southeast to Warren and south to Bristol. It was owned by the B&P through a majority of stock, and leased the Old Colony Railroad in 1891.

The Warren and Fall River Railroad was incorporated in Rhode Island in 1856, and the Fall River and Warren Railroad in Massachusetts in 1857. In 1860 the two were merged to form the Fall River, Warren and Providence Railroad, opening later in 1860 from Warren east to Somerset, across the Taunton River from Fall River. In 1875, the Boston and Providence Railroad Bridge opened, connecting to the Old Colony Railroad in Fall River. At that time, the company was leased by the Old Colony; before that it had been controlled by the B&P.

Station listing

Main line
This listing includes all stations that have existed along the post-1847 B&P alignment from Park Square, Boston to Providence. Mileage is from Park Square; distances to South Station are 0.8 miles longer. These mileages reflect the pre-realignment routings in Pawtucket and Providence. Some stations were not opened until after the B&P had merged into the Old Colony. Currently open stations are lightlighted.

Stoughton Branch

References

Changes to Transit Service in the MBTA district (PDF)
Railroad History Database
Mileposts from FRA Highway-Rail Crossing Inventory Files
 Report of Mr. Hayward on the Railroad Survey Between Boston and Providence from pages 71–112 of the  Report of the Board of Directors of Internal Improvements of the State of Massachusetts. By James Fowle Baldwin, James Hayward, Solomon Willard, published 1829, 196 pages.

External links

B&P Railroad
B&P Railroad - Flickr
Canton Viaduct - Flickr
L. P. Allen, Collector. Railroad labor payrolls, 1832-. 5483. Kheel Center for Labor-Management Documentation and Archives, Martin P. Catherwood Library, Cornell University. 

Companies affiliated with the Old Colony Railroad
Predecessors of the New York, New Haven and Hartford Railroad
Defunct Massachusetts railroads
Defunct Rhode Island railroads
Railway companies established in 1831
Railway companies disestablished in 1972
Old Colony Railroad lines
American companies established in 1831
American companies disestablished in 1972